Oliver Township is the name of some places in the U.S. state of Michigan:

 Oliver Township, Huron County, Michigan
 Oliver Township, Kalkaska County, Michigan

See also 
 Olive Township, Michigan (disambiguation)

Michigan township disambiguation pages